News agencies were created to provide newspapers with information about a wide variety of news events happening around the world. Initially the agencies were meant to provide the news items only to newspapers, but with the passage of time the rapidly developing modern mediums such as radio, television and Internet too adapted the services of news agencies.

Founded in 1835 as Agence Havas, and changing its name in 1944, Agence France-Presse (AFP) is the world's oldest news agency, and is the third largest news agency in the modern world after the Associated Press (AP) and Reuters.

Founded in 1846, Associated Press was founded in New York in the U.S. as a not-for-profit news agency. Associated Press was challenged by the 1907 creation of United Press Associations by E.W. Scripps and the International News Service in 1909 by William Randolph Hearst. 
United Press absorbed INS to form United Press International in 1958.

In 1851, Reuters was founded in England and is now the second largest news agency in the world with over 2,000 offices across the globe.

With the advent of communism in Russia, Telegraph Agency of the Soviet Union (TASS) was founded in 1925.

Xinhua was later founded as Red China News Services in the Chinese Soviet Republic.

Political change in the Third World resulted in a new wave of information dissemination and a series of news agencies were born out of it. These agencies later formed their own Non-Aligned News Agencies Pool (NANAP), which served as a premiere information service in the Third World.

EFE is a Spanish news agency, it is the biggest in Spanish language, and is the fourth largest worldwide, it was founded in 1939.

List
Below is the list of the principal news agencies.

A–M

Afghanistan
Afghan Islamic Press
Bakhtar News Agency
Khaama Press
Pajhwok Afghan News
Albania
Albanian Telegraphic Agency
Algeria
Algeria Press Service
Angola
Angola Press News Agency
Argentina
Telam
Armenia
Armenpress
PanARMENIAN.Net
Australia
Australian Associated Press
NCA NewsWire
Austria
Austria Press Agency
Azerbaijan
AZERTAG
Trend News Agency
Bahrain
Bahrain News Agency
Bangladesh
Bangladesh Sangbad Sangstha
 Bdnews24.com
United News of Bangladesh
Belarus
BelaPAN
BelTA
Belgium
Belga
Bhutan
Bhutan News Service
Bolivia
Agencia Boliviana de Información
Bolpress
 Bosnia and Herzegovina
FENA - Federal News Agency - Federalna novinska agencija
Brazil
Agência Brasil
Agência Estado
Agência O Globo
Bulgaria
Bulgarian News Agency
Cambodia
Agence Kampuchea Press
Canada
The Canadian Press (La Presse Canadienne)
China
China News Service
Xinhua
CCTV+
Colombia
Noticias Caracol
Citytv Bogotá
Canal 1
Croatia
Croatian News Agency
Cuba
Prensa Latina
Cyprus
Cyprus News Agency
Czech Republic
Czech News Agency
Denmark
Ritzau
East Timor
Tatoli
Ecuador
Public News Agency of Ecuador and South America
Egypt
Middle East News Agency
Estonia
Baltic News Service
Ethiopia
Ethiopian News Agency
Fiji
Pacnews
Finland
Suomen Tietotoimisto
France
Agence France-Presse
Germany
Deutsche Presse-Agentur
Evangelischer Pressedienst
Sport-Informations-Dienst
Georgia
GHN
Ghana
Ghana News Agency
Greece
Athens-Macedonian News Agency
Hungary
Magyar Távirati Iroda
India
Asian News International
Hindusthan Samachar
Indo-Asian News Service
Press Trust of India
United News of India
Indonesia
Antara
KBR
Iran
Fars News Agency
Iranian Labour News Agency
Iranian Students' News Agency
Islamic Republic News Agency
Mehr News Agency
Tasnim News Agency
Iraq
National Iraqi News Agency
Israel
ITIM
Italy
Adnkronos
Agenzia Giornalistica Italia
Agenzia Giornalistica RCS
Agenzia Nazionale Stampa Associata
Ansa Mediterranean
APCOM
ASCA
AsiaNews
Il Sole 24 Ore Radiocor
Inter Press Service (IPS)
Japan
Jiji Press
Kyodo News
Jordan
Jordan News Agency
Kazakhstan
Kazinform
Kenya
Kenya News Agency
Kosovo
Kosova Press
Kuwait
Kuwait News Agency
 Kyrgyzstan
AKIpress news agency
Kabar
Laos
Lao News Agency
Latvia
LETA
Lithuania
ELTA
Malawi
Malawi News Agency
Malaysia
Bernama
Mexico
Notimex
Moldova
Moldpres
Mongolia
Montsame
Montenegro
Montenegrin News Agency
Morocco
Maghreb Arabe Press
Myanmar
Myanmar News Agency
Myanmar Now

N–Z

Namibia
Namibia Press Agency
Nepal
Rastriya Samachar Samiti
Netherlands
Algemeen Nederlands Persbureau (ANP)
Nigeria
News Agency of Nigeria
North Korea
Korean Central News Agency
North Macedonia
Media Information Agency
Makfax
Norway
Avisenes Nyhetsbyrå
Norsk Telegrambyrå
Oman
Oman News Agency
Pakistan
Associated Press of Pakistan
Associated Press Service
Pakistan Press International
Palestinian Territories
Ma'an News Agency
Wafa
Peru
Andina
Philippines
Philippine News Agency
Poland
Polish Press Agency
Portugal
Agência Lusa
Via News Agency
Qatar
Qatar News Agency
Romania
AGERPRES
Mediafax
Rador
Russia
Interfax
Rossiya Segodnya
Russian News Agency TASS (TASS)
Saudi Arabia
International Islamic News Agency
Saudi Press Agency
Senegal
PanaPress
Serbia
Beta News Agency
Tanjug 
Seychelles
Seychelles News Agency
Singapore
CNA
Slovakia
News Agency of the Slovak Republic
Slovenia
Slovenian Press Agency
South Africa
African News Agency
South Korea
Newsis
Yonhap News Agency
South Sudan
South Sudan News Agency
Spain
Agencia EFE
Catalan News Agency
Europa Press
Sri Lanka
Lankapuvath
Sudan
Sudan News Agency
Sweden
Direkt
Tidningarnas Telegrambyrå
Switzerland
Swiss Telegraphic Agency
Syria
Hawar News Agency
Syrian Arab News Agency
Taiwan
Central News Agency
Tajikistan
Khovar
Thailand
Thai News Agency
Tunisia
Tunis Afrique Presse
Turkey
Anadolu Agency
Anka News Agency
Demirören News Agency
İhlas News Agency
Turkmenistan
Turkmenistan State News Agency
Ukraine
Ukrainian Independent Information Agency
Ukrainian News Agency
Ukrinform
United Arab Emirates
Emirates News Agency
United Kingdom
PA Media
Reuters
BBC News
ITN
Sky News
United States
Associated Press
Bloomberg News
Catholic News Agency
Catholic News Service
Fourth Estate
Jewish Telegraphic Agency
Religion News Service
United Press International
Uzbekistan
Uzbekistan National News Agency
Vatican City
Agenzia Fides
Venezuela
Agencia Venezolana de Noticias
Vietnam
Vietnam News Agency
Yemen
Saba News Agency

See also

 List of press release agencies
 List of wire services

References

Journalism lists